Matato’a is a musical and dance group from Easter Island (Rapa Nui). It is one of the most famous bands from the island. Matato'a was founded in 1996 by Kevamatato’a Atan. It was in 1998 that they adopted the name of Matato'a, which means 'warrior' or 'guardian'. They played all over Chile in the same year. Mito Manutomatoma, a founding member, left the group in 1999 to play mainstream Chilean music.

The group, consisting largely of family members, uses traditional instruments, such as stones, horse jawbone, and bombo along with electric guitars and other modern elements to create a unique fusion sound.

Matato'a's principal motivation is to promote the ancestral traditions, the dances, the costumes, & body paintings of the Rapa Nui People. Performances are high-energy, with intensive indigenous cultural representation.

See also 

Music of Easter Island

References

External links
 Official web site
 Sounds Across the Pacific | TO HEAR THE MUSIC WHEN IT COMES IS THE GIFT

Polynesian musicians
Easter Island people
Rapanui people
Chilean folk musical groups
Musical groups established in 1996
1996 establishments in Easter Island